Sara River, a perennial stream that is part of the Clarence River catchment, is located in the New England and Northern Tablelands districts of New South Wales, Australia.

Course and features
Sara River rises on the southern slopes of Mount Mitchell on the western slopes of the Great Dividing Range, east of Ben Lomond, and flows generally to the east, joined by three tributaries, including Oban River, before forming its confluence with the Guy Fawkes River to form the Boyd River within Guy Fawkes River National Park and Chaelundi National Park. Sara River descends  over its  course.

See also

 List of rivers of Australia

References

 

Rivers of New South Wales
Northern Tablelands